Andorra Televisió is an Andorran free-to-air television channel owned and operated by public broadcaster Ràdio i Televisió d'Andorra (RTVA). It is the company's flagship television channel, and is known for broadcasting mainstream and generalist programming, including l'Informatiu news bulletins, prime time drama, cinema and entertainment, and major breaking news, sports and special events. It was launched on 4 December 1995.

History
Test transmissions began the evening of Monday 4 December 1995. The following day regular broadcasts began with an edition of Informatiu Migdia (Midday News).

The first drama series created by the channel was broadcast on Monday 1 November 1999. It was called Cim de passions (Height of Passions) and was about a family of hoteliers.

Frequencies
Digital Frequencies
 Channel 42 UHF: Andorra
 Channel 61 UHF: Alt Urgell

Logos and identities

External links
Official Site (Catalan)
Watch Live

Communications in Andorra
European Broadcasting Union members
Publicly funded broadcasters
Organizations established in 1995
Television channels and stations established in 1995
1995 establishments in Andorra
State media